Haqqulobod ( or) is a city in Namangan Region, Uzbekistan. It is the administrative center of Norin District. Its population is 27,000 (2016).

References

Populated places in Namangan Region
Cities in Uzbekistan